Iraqi Persians or Iranians in Iraq are Iraqi citizens of Persian descent and background. Persians have had a long presence in Iraq, since the Fall of Babylon.

History
In the 1970s, Saddam Hussein exiled between 350,000 to 650,000 Shia Iraqis of Iranian ancestry. Most of them went to Iran. Those who could prove an Iranian/Persian ancestry in Iran's court received Iranian citizenship (400,000) and most of them returned to Iraq immediately after his fall. The population of Persian Iraqis is currently 486,000 (not including Iranian residents in Iraq).

Culture 
However, a significant portion of them are of Sayyid Iranian heritage of Arab origin which were moved to Iran under the Safavids and returned to Arab lands after the fall of the Safavids. Some even being descended from the al-Musawi clan.

See also
Iranian diaspora
Moaved
Medes
Achaemenid Assyria
Asuristan
Parthian Empire
Baghdad Province (Safavid Empire)

References

Demographics of Iraq
Ethnic groups in Iraq

Iranian diaspora in the Middle East
Ethnic groups in the Middle East
Iranic people
Persian people